Male privilege is the system of advantages or rights that are available to men solely on the basis of their sex. A man's access to these benefits may vary depending on how closely they match their society's ideal masculine norm.

Academic studies of male privilege were a focus of feminist scholarship during the 1970s. These studies began by examining barriers to equity between the sexes. In later decades, researchers began to focus on the intersectionality and overlapping nature of privileges relating to sex, race, social class, sexual orientation, and other forms of social classification.

Overview 

Special privileges and status are granted to males in patriarchal societies. These are societies defined by male supremacy, in which males hold primary power and predominate in roles of political leadership, moral authority, social privilege and control of property. With systemic subordination of women, males gain economic, political, social, educational, and practical advantages that are more or less unavailable to women. The long-standing and unquestioned nature of such patriarchal systems, reinforced over generations, tends to make privilege invisible to holders; it can lead males who benefit from such privilege to ascribe their special status to their own individual merits and achievements, rather than to unearned advantages.

In the field of sociology, male privilege is seen as embedded in the structure of social institutions, as when men are often assigned authority over women in the workforce, and benefit from women's traditional caretaking role. Privileges can be classified as either positive or negative, depending on how they affect the rest of society. Women's studies scholar Peggy McIntosh writes: 

Some negative advantages accompanying male privilege include such things as the expectation that a man will have a better chance than a comparably qualified woman of being hired for a job, as well as being paid more than a woman for the same job.

Scope
The term "male privilege" does not apply to a solitary occurrence of the use of power, but rather describes one of many systemic power structures that are interdependent and interlinked throughout societies and cultures.

Privilege is not shared equally by all males. Those who most closely match an ideal masculine norm benefit the most from privilege. In Western patriarchal societies this ideal has been described as being "white, heterosexual, stoic, wealthy, strong, tough, competitive, and autonomous". Men's studies scholars refer to this ideal masculine norm as hegemonic masculinity. While essentially all males benefit from privilege to some degree, those who visibly differ from the norm may not benefit fully in certain situations, especially in the company of other men that more closely match it.

Men who have experienced bullying and domestic violence in youth, in particular, may not accept the idea that they are beneficiaries of privilege. Such forms of coercive violence are linked to the idea of toxic masculinity, a specific model of manhood that creates hierarchies of dominance in which some are favored and others are harmed.

The invisibility of male privilege can be seen for instance in discussions of the gender pay gap in the United States; the gap is usually referred to by stating women's earnings as a percentage of men's. However, using women's pay as the baseline highlights the dividend that males receive as greater earnings (32% in 2005). In commerce, male dominance in the ownership and control of financial capital and other forms of wealth has produced disproportionate male influence over the working classes and the hiring and firing of employees. In addition, a disproportionate burden is placed upon women in employment when they are expected to be solely responsible for child care; they may be more likely to be fired or be denied advancement in their profession, thus putting them at an economic disadvantage relative to men.

Scholarship

The earliest academic studies of privilege appeared with feminist scholars' work in the area of women's studies during the 1970s. Such scholarship began by examining barriers to equity between the sexes. In later decades, researchers began to focus on the intersectionality and overlapping nature of privileges relating to sex, race, social class, sexual orientation, and other forms of social classification.

Peggy McIntosh, one of the first feminist scholars to examine male privilege,  wrote about both male privilege and white privilege, using the metaphor of the "invisible knapsack" to describe a set of advantages borne, often unaware and unacknowledged, by members of privileged groups. According to McIntosh, privilege is not a result of a concerted effort to oppress those of the opposite gender; however, the inherent benefits that men gain from the systemic bias put women at an innate disadvantage. The benefits of this unspoken privilege may be described as special provisions, tools, relationships, or various other opportunities. According to McIntosh, this privilege may actually negatively affect men's development as human beings, and few question that the existing structure of advantages may be challenged or changed.

Efforts to examine the role of privilege in students' lives has become a regular feature of university education in North America. By drawing attention to the presence of privilege (including male, white, and other forms) in the lives of students, educators have sought to foster insights that can help students contribute to social justice. Such efforts include McIntosh's "invisible knapsack" model of privilege and the "Male Privilege Checklist".

Cultural responses

Many men have responded to discussions of male privilege by saying that they do not feel that they have been given any unearned advantages, such as in their struggles to find success in employment, education, or relationships. Advocates for men's rights and father's rights as well as anti-feminist men often accept that men's traditional roles are damaging to men but deny that men as a group have institutional power and privilege, and argue that men are now victims relative to women.

Some have taken active roles in challenging oppressive sexism and misogyny, arguing that male privilege is deeply linked to the oppression of women. They describe men's oppressive behaviors as cultural traits learned within patriarchal social systems, rather than inborn biological traits. Advocates within the broader men's movement oriented towards profeminism or anti-sexism argue that traditional gender roles harm both men and women. "Liberal" profeminism tends to stress the ways men suffer from these traditional roles, while more "radical" profeminism tends to emphasize male privilege and sexual inequality. Some men may also be advocates of women's rights but deny that their privilege as a whole is a part of the issue at hand.

Preference of sons over daughters

In both India and China, male offspring are often privileged and favored over female children. Some manifestations of son preference and the devaluation of women are eliminating unwanted daughters through neglect, maltreatment, abandonment, as well as female infanticide and feticide despite laws that prohibit infanticide and sex-selective pregnancy termination. In India some of these practices have contributed to skewed sex ratios in favor of male children at birth and in the first five years. Other examples of privileging male offspring are special "praying for a son" ceremonies during pregnancy, more ceremony and festivities following the birth of a boy, listing and introducing sons before daughters, and common felicitations that associate good fortune and well-being with the number of sons.

Reasons given for preferring sons to daughters include sons' role in religious family rites, which daughters are not permitted to perform, and the belief that sons are permanent members of the birth family whereas daughters belong to their husband's family after marriage in accordance with patrilocal tradition. Other reasons include patrilineal customs whereby only sons can carry on the family name, the obligation to pay dowry to a daughter's husband or his family, and the expectation that sons will support their birth parents financially while it is regarded as undesirable or shameful to receive financial support from daughters.

See also

Androcentrism
Anti-discrimination law
Chauvinism
Gender
Gender marking in job titles
Gender bias on Wikipedia
Harem effect (science)
Honorary male
Generic antecedent
Global Gender Gap Report
Male as norm

References

Further reading

 
 
 
 
 
 
  Pdf.
  Pdf.
 
 
 

Men
Gender equality
Sexism
Social privilege
Feminist terminology
Feminist theory